

Events
Paul Kelly's nightclub Little Naples is forced to close under pressure from reform movements. 
Louis "Louie the Lump" Pioggi joins the Five Points Gang at age seventeen. Within two years he would become a prominent gunman within the gang. 
Nicola Gentile becomes a member of the Philadelphia crime family. 
Charles "Lucky" Luciano, then nine-years-old, immigrates to New York with his family.
March 8 - Lupo the Wolf is arrested and charged with kidnapping Tony Bonzuffi, the son of an East Side banker and suspected Black Hand victim.

Arts and literature
The Story of the Kelly Gang (film)

Births
 February 24 – Anthony Anastasio, New York Waterfront leader for the Gambino crime family 
 February 28 – Benjamin "Bugsy" Siegel, Meyer Lansky associate, Murder, Inc. member, and Las Vegas casino owner 
 March 28 – Antonino Joseph "Joe Batters" Accardo, boss of the Chicago Outfit
 October 9 – William "Smokes" Aloisio, Chicago Outfit member and syndicate hitman

References

Organized crime
Years in organized crime